Inger-Mari Aikio-Arianaick (born 1961 in Utsjoki, Finland) is a Sámi poet who writes in Northern Sámi. In addition to writing poetry, she has worked as a reporter, photographer and proofreader for the newspaper Sámi Áigi from 1982 to 1988, after which she went to work as a news journalist for YLE Sámi Radio.

Biography 
After graduating from high school in 1980, Aikio-Arianaick studied languages at the University of Oulu. In 1992, she passed the official translator exams from Northern Sámi to Finnish and from Finnish to Northern Sámi.

Aikio-Arianaick has also published seven collections of poetry and children's books. Her poems have been translated in English, German, Finnish, Swedish, Hungarian.

Works 
 Gollebiekkat almmi dievva (1989)
 Jiehki vuolde ruonas giđđa (1993)
 Silkeguobbara lákca (1995)
 Máilmmis dása (2001)
 69 čuoldda (2018)

References

External links

1961 births
20th-century Finnish poets
20th-century women writers
21st-century Finnish poets
21st-century Finnish women writers
Finnish women poets
Living people
People from Utsjoki
Sámi-language poets